Uhuru is a bootleg version of the album Welcome Home (1975) by British Afro rock band Osibisa, released without authorisation in 1992 by Soundwings Records (MC-102.1076-2) and distributed by Serenade S.A., Barcelona, Spain.  The CD duplicates the Welcome Home album (in poorer fidelity) with the addition of one track from an Osibisa's live video.

Track listing
All songs written by Teddy Osei, Mac Tontoh and Sol Amarfio, except The Dawn written by Teddy Osei and Sol Amarfio.

Sources
Tracks 1-9 from Welcome Home (Osibisa album) (1975)
Track 10 from live concert video (Marquee Club, 1983)

Personnel
Release includes no musician credits

References
All information gathered from back CD cover Uhuru (Copyright © 1992 Soundwings Records MC-102.1076-2).
audio-music.info

1992 compilation albums
Osibisa albums